Novokucherganovka is a rural locality (a selo) in Starokucherganovsky Selsoviet, Narimanovsky District, Astrakhan Oblast, Russia. The population was 482 as of 2010. There are 14 streets.

Geography 
Novokucherganovka is located 51 km south of Narimanov (the district's administrative centre) by road. Starokucherganovka is the nearest rural locality.

References 

Rural localities in Narimanovsky District